Nathan Michael Sestina (born May 12, 1997) is an American professional basketball player for Türk Telekom of the Turkish Basketbol Süper Ligi (BSL). He played college basketball for the Bucknell Bison and the Kentucky Wildcats.

Early life and high school career
Sestina was born in St. Marys, Pennsylvania and grew up in Emporium, Pennsylvania. As a senior at Cameron County High School, Sestina averaged 22.6 points and 14 rebounds per game and was named the North Tier Conference Player of the Year. He finished high school with 1,703 points and 955 rebounds, a school record. Sestina committed to play college basketball at Bucknell over offers from 11 other schools. He became the first Division I basketball player from PIAA District 9 since 1990 and the first division I athlete of any kind from Cameron County since the 1970s.

College career
Sestina suffered a season-ending shoulder injury four games into his freshman year and used a medical redshirt. He averaged 4.8 points and 3.7 rebounds per game over 31 games as a reserve player during his sophomore year. As a junior, Sestina averaged 6.5 points and 3.9 rebounds and 14.9 minutes played per game. He became a starter going into his senior year and enjoyed a breakout season, averaging 15.8 points (6th in the Patriot League) and 8.5 rebounds per game (2nd in conference) and was named to the second team All-Patriot League. Following the end of the season, Sestina entered the transfer portal for his final season of eligibility as a graduate transfer. He was ranked the third-best player in the transfer portal by ESPN. Sestina committed to transfer to the University of Kentucky.

In his first game with the Wildcats, Sestina scored seven points and grabbed a team-high six rebounds in a 69–62 win over top-ranked Michigan State and hit a key three-point shot in the second half. He broke his left wrist six games into the season against Lamar, causing him to miss four weeks and three games. Sestina was averaging 7.3 points and 7.2 rebounds per game in 27.8 minutes of play at the time of the injury. Sestina returned in a game against Utah on December 18 and was scoreless. In the next game versus Ohio State, Sestina scored a season-high 17 points even though Kentucky lost 71–65. He scored his 1,000th career point during a 13-point game against LSU on February 18, 2020. Sestina averaged 5.8 and 3.8 rebounds per game in 28 games and was named to the Southeastern Conference Community Service Team.

Professional career
On July 30, 2020, Sestina signed his first professional contract with Kyiv-Basket of the Ukrainian SuperLeague. On October 13, he signed with Nizhny Novgorod of the VTB United League. However, with the season being cancelled, Sestina was released on November 3, before playing an official game for the team.

After going undrafted in the 2020 NBA draft, Sestina signed an Exhibit 10 contract for with the Brooklyn Nets on December 1, 2020. He was waived by the Nets on December 11. He was added to the roster of the Nets' NBA G League affiliate, the Long Island Nets.

On March 15, 2021, he signed with Hapoel Holon of the Israeli Basketball Premier League.

On July 8, 2021, he has signed with Merkezefendi Belediyesi Denizli Basket of the Basketbol Süper Ligi.

On June 22, 2022, he has signed with Türk Telekom of the Turkish Basketbol Süper Ligi (BSL).

Career statistics

College

|-
| style="text-align:left;"|2015–16
| style="text-align:left;"|Bucknell
| 4 || 0 || 8.0 || .545 || .667 || 1.000 || 1.3 || .8 || .5 || .0 || 3.8
|-
| style="text-align:left;"|2016–17
| style="text-align:left;"|Bucknell
| 31 || 1 || 12.0 || .508 || .292 || .696 || 3.7 || .4 || .2 || .5 || 4.8
|-
| style="text-align:left;"|2017–18
| style="text-align:left;"|Bucknell
| 34 || 0 || 14.9 || .560 || .341 || .744 || 3.9 || .9 || .3 || .6 || 6.5
|-
| style="text-align:left;"|2018–19
| style="text-align:left;"|Bucknell
| 31 || 31 || 27.8 || .536 || .380 || .808 || 8.5 || 1.2 || .4 || 1.1 || 15.8
|-
| style="text-align:left;"|2019–20
| style="text-align:left;"|Kentucky
| 28 || 7 || 19.8 || .463 || .407 || .750 || 3.8 || .8 || .4 || .6 || 5.8
|- class="sortbottom"
| style="text-align:center;" colspan="2"|Career
| 128 || 39 || 18.2 || .525 || .374 || .773 || 4.9 || .8 || .3 || .7 || 8.1

Personal life
Sestina's father, Donald is a former teacher, basketball coach and athletic director for Cameron County High School and his mother, Rachelle, is also a teacher and swam collegiately at Indiana University of Pennsylvania. He has four siblings and his two older brothers, Andrew and Jason, both served in the United States Marine Corps.

References

External links
 Bucknell Bison bio
 Kentucky Wildcats bio
 RealGM profile

1999 births
Living people
American expatriate basketball people in Israel
American expatriate basketball people in Turkey
American men's basketball players
Basketball players from Pennsylvania
Bucknell Bison men's basketball players
Centers (basketball)
Hapoel Holon players
Kentucky Wildcats men's basketball players
Long Island Nets players
Merkezefendi Belediyesi Denizli Basket players
People from St. Marys, Pennsylvania
People from Emporium, Pennsylvania
Power forwards (basketball)